The Investigative Reporting Workshop is a nonprofit, investigative news organization focusing on significant issues of public concern.

The Workshop is an incubator and laboratory for original, nonpartisan watchdog reporting.  As a professional journalism center in the School of Communication at American University, the Investigative Reporting Workshop is one of 18 university-based investigative journalism centers in the nation and the only one in Washington, D.C.  The Workshop mentors and enables the work of a new generation of investigative reporters while also enlarging the public space for the leading journalists of our time.

Long-term projects include coverage of the banking and credit union industries, illegal immigration and the administration's enforcement policies; and the telecommunications industry, particularly as it relates to the digital divide between rich and poor.

The Workshop collaborates with other media outlets as publishing partners, and those include The Washington Post, NBCNews.com (formerly MSNBC.com), Frontline, The Philadelphia Inquirer, National Journal, The Daily Beast, New America Media and McClatchy Newspapers, among others.

History

Founding
The nonprofit was founded by American University professors Charles Lewis, a national investigative journalist for more than 30 years, and Wendell Cochran, a longtime business reporter and editor, in the spring of 2008; the publishing of original content began the spring of 2009. Lewis, a former producer for "60 Minutes,” founded four nonprofits in Washington, including the Center for Public Integrity, and has written six books, including “The Buying of the President 2004,” and is a MacArthur Fellow. He is executive editor. In 2018, Lewis won the I.F. Stone Medal for Journalistic Independence. Cochran, who recently retired, was a business reporter, editor and journalism faculty member.

Editors
Lynne Perri, former deputy managing editor for graphics and photography at USA TODAY and a former reporter and editor at The Tampa Tribune, is managing editor. Lewis and Cochran are tenured faculty members in the School of Communication at American University; Perri is a journalist-in-residence. She teaches reporting, journalism ethics and visual journalism.

John Sullivan, a Pulitzer Prize winner from The Philadelphia Inquirer, is a senior editor. Sullivan is a reporter on The Washington Post's Investigations team and teaches an investigative practicum at the graduate level. Sullivan spearheaded a new partnership between the Workshop and The Washington Post.

Jennifer LaFleur, former senior editor for the award-winning Reveal from the Center for Investigative Reporting, is data editor. LaFleur joined the Workshop in 2017 and is a data journalist-in-residence at American University. LaFleur teaches data journalism and has won numerous journalism awards, including for her coverage of disability, legal and open government issues.

Kris Higgins, who holds a MFA in Film & Media Arts from the School of Communication at American University, is the operating producer. He spent more than a decade overseeing grants and programs at various nonprofit organizations.

Nancy Sturm joined the Investigative Reporting Workshop as development director in 2018. Sturm led development departments and programs at various organizations, including the national League of Women Voters, Common Cause and the National Endowment for the Humanities, among others.

Background
The model for the Workshop is the Children's Television Workshop, which originally was created to produce “Sesame Street,” but became an incubator and innovator for much of educational television.

Advisory board
The Workshop Advisory Board consists of 13 journalists from five continents.

Recent Work
The Workshop published "The Boy on the Bus" on April 4, 2018. The story, about how sex offender registries can fail and how difficult it can be to put convicted child molesters on national lists, was co-published with IowaWatch.org.

On April 2, 2018, the Workshop published "Stockman and the Donors," an investigation into former Texas Congressman Steve Stockman and a GOP contribution of $450,000 that may have been related to gun lobbyists.

Notable Work

Trump Inc.
The story, "At Trump’s big-city hotels, business dropped as his political star rose, internal documents show,", by the Workshop's Morgan Krakow and the Post's David A. Fahrenthold and Jonathan O’Connell, is about how business at Trump properties fell as his political ambitions rose. The investigation reveals how bitter some individual owners are at their losses. One of their key findings: “Between 2015 and 2017, revenue from room rentals at the New York hotel declined 14 percent … At Trump’s hotel in Chicago, a document [showed] a similar drop-off. Bookings fell 8 percent from 2015 to 2016, and this year’s figures are still lower than the pace in 2016.”

Collateral Damage
The online and on-air stories, "Caught between gun violence and aggressive policing", document the D.C. police department's aggressive focus on getting illegal guns off the streets. The Workshop combined forces with WAMU-FM, the NPR affiliate in Washington.

Truth and Lies in the Trump Era
Founding Executive Editor Charles Lewis authored an editorial article examining the watchdog status of the media in post-Trump America. The article was co-published with The Nation Magazine.

The New Americans
This investigation looks at the struggles of refugees attempting to make a home in San Diego. This series is a collaboration with inewsource and KPBS in San Diego. 
The most recent story, "Trauma and transitions: How San Diego grapples with educating refugees," was published in August 2017.

Washington Post Partnership on Police Shootings

Since 2013, The Workshop has partnered with the Washington Post. In the last two years, many of the stories focused on maintaining a nationwide database of fatal shootings by police. The most recent installment in the series was published in July 2017.

Investigating Power
The online, multimedia project, Investigating Power showcases more than 50 hours of interviews with distinguished journalists. This project documents “moments of truth” in contemporary U.S. history and the careers of notable journalists since the 1950s. It is a part of a larger project and book, “The Future of Truth,” by Charles Lewis, the former "60 Minutes" producer.

In January 2018, Investigating Power was reworked with a new look and additional content. The update added educator resources for both the middle and high school level and the undergraduate/post-secondary level.

What Went Wrong
An 18-month series, “What Went Wrong: the Betrayal of the American Dream,” by James Steele and Don Barlett, of Vanity Fair and formerly of the Philadelphia Inquirer, with contributions by Kat Aaron, Michael Lawson and other Workshop staffers. The series documents how 40 years of public policy and Wall Street business practices have conspired against working people. Barlett and Steele's new book, "The Betrayal of the American Dream," researched with the help of Workshop staff, was released Aug. 1, 2012, and was on both The New York Times and Los Angeles Times best-seller lists. In December 2012, the Workshop published the story of Momentive, a chemical company in upstate New York that was bought out by a private-equity firm. Kat Aaron’s two-year investigation included onsite interviews and a review of more than 1,000 pages of documents obtained under the Freedom of Information Act.

Documentaries

FRONTLINE documentaries
The Workshop has an ongoing partnership with the PBS program Frontline. Productions include "Flying Cheap" a documentary about the impact of the major carriers’ reliance on regional airlines and their pilots, which won a Screen Actors Guild Award for writing; a follow-up, “Flying Cheaper,” a follow-up about the impact of outsourcing maintenance on planes; and “Lost in Detention,” a documentary that chronicled the administration’s enforcement policy, which has deported 400,000 people annually the last two years and put thousands in detention centers with legal representation, often splitting up families in which the children are U.S. citizens. In 2012 and 2013, the Workshop also co-produced "Big Sky, Big Money," which chronicles campaign finance in Montana; "The Digital Campaign," about the 2012 presidential race; and "Hunting the Nightmare Bacteria," a look at the pervasive problem of drug resistant infestions in hospitals. 

In 2017, The Workshop collaborated with Frontline to produce "Poverty, Politics, and Profit: The Housing Crisis."

In 2018, The Workshop co-produced "Blackout in Puerto Rico," with PBS Frontline and NPR. It aired on PBS stations across the country and online.

National Awards

I.F. Stone Award
Executive Editor Chuck Lewis talks about how meaningful it was to win an award for journalistic independence.

Scripps Howard Awards
In March 2012, the Workshop was named a “finalist” in the Business/Economics Reporting category of the Scripps Howard Awards for the project, "What Went Wrong: The Betrayal of the American Dream." The series, spearheaded by Kat Aaron as project editor, with reporters Jim Steele and Don Barlett as well as contributions from the staff, focused on how policies in Washington and on Wall Street have hurt Americans for far longer than the most recent recession.

Society of American Business Editors and Writers (SABEW)
In March 2010, the Workshop's Wendell Cochran, Matt Waite, Richard Mullins, Lynne Perri and Lisa Hill were recognized for "BankTracker," in the category of "Best in Business Online" for "Creative Use of the Online Medium, small websites, 2009."

Society of Professional Journalists
Executive Editor Charles Lewis and Hilary Niles, a former Workshop intern, wrote "Measuring Impact: The art, science and mystery of nonprofit news assessment," which has received a 2013 Sigma Delta Chi Award from the Society of Professional Journalists in the "Research about Journalism" category. 
 
In 2010, the Workshop, along with Frontline, received a Society of Professional Journalists award in the Television category for its “Flying Cheap: Regional airlines cut cost of flying, at what price?” documentary. The Sigma Delta Chi Awards for Excellence in Journalism recognize distinguished service to the American people and the profession of journalism through outstanding accomplishments.

iLab Division
Through the center’s iLab division, the Workshop conducts research on and experiments with new models for doing and delivering investigative journalism. iLab’s efforts helped lead to the development of the Investigative News Network and aided the establishment of several other nonprofit news groups.

Through iLab, the Workshop has tracked and published two major reports on the new nonprofit journalism ecosystem, and efforts to uncover what is happening in North Korea with its poor citizens. Lewis has written more than 20 articles about the new nonprofit journalism ecosystem.

Reports and Filing

IRS Filing
The Workshop operates under the 501(c)(3) designation of American University.

Funding
The Investigative Reporting Workshop does not accept corporate or government support, and instead relies on private foundations and public supporters to continue to build upon its work. It has been declared tax-exempt by the Internal Revenue Service, which means donations to the organization are tax-deductible.

Donors
A list of the foundations that have made grants to the Workshop since its inception in May 2008:

External links
 Investigative Reporting Workshop
 iLab
 Center for Public Integrity 
 Investigating Power
 What Went Wrong: The Betrayal of the American Dream

References

Investigative journalism
News agencies based in the United States
Online magazines published in the United States
Articles containing video clips